Gray L. Dorsey (died July 20, 1997)  was an American law professor. He was professor emeritus of international law at Washington University in St. Louis, and had been the Charles Nagel Professor of Jurisprudence in International Law.  He had also been president of the International Association for Philosophy of Law and Social Philosophy.

He was the subject of a festschrift, Law, culture, and values: essays in honor of Gray L. Dorsey.

Dorsey  was born in Hamilton, Missouri.

Books

Validation of new forms of social organization; edited by authorization of the American Section of the International Association for Philosophy of Law and Social Philosophy (AMINTAPHIL) by Gray L. Dorsey and Samuel I. Shuman.
Bar Association of St. Louis. 	Constitutional freedom and the law. Sponsored by Bar Association of St. Louis in cooperation with School of Law, Washington University, and School of Law, St. Louis University. Project directors and consulting editors: Gray L. Dorsey [and] John E. Dunsfor 	1965 	
American freedoms : an essay on the Bill of rights / by Gray L. Dorsey.	 [Buffalo, N.Y.] : W. S. Hein, 1974.  	
Beyond the United Nations : changing discourse in international politics and law / Gray L. Dorsey. 	 Lanham : University Press of America, c1986.  (hardcover),	 (paperback)	
Cases and materials on international law and social change, by Gray L. Dorsey. 	1973 	
Cases and materials on international law and social change, by Gray L. Dorsey. 	1971 	
Jurisculture / Gray Dorsey. 	1989 	
Jurisculture: law and social change, by Gray L. Dorsey.  St. Louis, Mo.  1972-
Law of conflict, by Gray L. Dorsey. 	1973 	
World Congress on Philosophy of Law and Social Philosophy (7th : 1975 : St. Louis, Mo.) 	Equality and freedom, international and comparative jurisprudence : papers of the World Congress on Philosophy of Law and Social Philosophy, St. Louis, 24–29 August 1975 / edited by authorization of Internationale Vereinigung für Rechts- und Sozialphilo

References

1997 deaths
American legal scholars
Washington University in St. Louis faculty
Philosophers of law
Year of birth missing
People from Hamilton, Missouri